The 2020–21 Utah Valley Wolverines men's basketball team represented Utah Valley University in the 2020–21 NCAA Division I men's basketball season. The Wolverines, led by second-year head coach Mark Madsen, played their home games at the UCCU Center in Orem, Utah as members of the Western Athletic Conference.

Previous season
The Wolverines finished the 2019–20 season 11–19, 5–10 in WAC play to finish in finish in eighth place. Due to irregularities in the WAC standings due to cancelled games, they were set to be the No. 6 seed in the WAC tournament, however, the tournament was cancelled amid the COVID-19 pandemic.

Roster

Schedule and results 

|-
!colspan=12 style=| Non-conference regular season

|-
!colspan=12 style=| WAC regular season

|-
!colspan=12 style=| WAC tournament
|-

|-

Sources

References

Utah Valley Wolverines men's basketball seasons
Utah Valley Wolverines
Utah Valley Wolverines men's basketball
Utah Valley Wolverines men's basketball